Hugo Moreira (born 30 October 1990) is a Portuguese footballer who plays for S.C. Salgueiros, as a defender. Besides Portugal, he has played in Moldova.

References

External links

Hugo Moreira at ZeroZero

1990 births
Living people
People from Maia, Portugal
Portuguese footballers
Portuguese expatriate footballers
Portuguese expatriate sportspeople in Moldova
Expatriate footballers in Moldova
S.C. Salgueiros players
FC Zimbru Chișinău players
C.D. Cinfães players
Moldovan Super Liga players
Association football defenders
Sportspeople from Porto District